Vessels is the first full-length album from psychedelic rock group Wolf & Cub. It was recorded in Adelaide, Australia from April 2005 and released on 28 August 2006. The album was mixed by producer Tony Doogan after lead singer Joel Byrne travelled to Scotland for 3 weeks. Tony Doogan previously worked with artists such as Mogwai, Belle & Sebastian, Super Furry Animals, Dirty Pretty Things and The Mountain Goats. The album was mastered by Greg Calbi in New York. Vessels features nine completely new tracks from the band and a reworking of their earlier single "Steal Their Gold". It peaked in the top 100 of the ARIA Albums Chart.

Reception 

The album was Drum Medias fifth most favoured album of 2006 as decided by over 20 reviewers. Internet publication and magazine, Mess + Noise, voted Vessels album artwork as the best of 2006. The album was bestowed Album of the Week by popular alternative radio station Triple J in September.

Versions 
Vessels was released on 28 August 2006 via Dot Dash in Australia. On 6 March 2007 it appeared on the 4AD label (home of TV on the Radio, Pixies, Breeders, Thievery Corporation, The Mountain Goats) elsewhere in the world. It comes in two formats: a standard jewel case edition and a limited edition digipak with embossed gold writing.

Track listing
Music by Wolf & Cub. Words by Joel Byrne.
"Vessels" – 6:42
"This Mess" – 3:48
"Rozalia Bizarre" – 3:37
"Hammond" – 3:55
"March of Clouds" – 4:14
"Kingdom" – 7:26
"Seeds of Doubt" – 3:55
"Conundrum" – 5:01
"Steal Their Gold" – 4:26
"Vultures, part 2, section 2" – 2:53

Personnel
Joel Byrne – vox, guitars, keys
Thomas Mayhew – bass
Joel Carey – drums/percussion
Adam Edwards – drums/percussion
Matt Hills – producer
Tony Doogan – mixing, additional production, recording
Greg Calbi – mastering
Monica Queen – backing vocals

Charts

References

2006 debut albums
Wolf & Cub albums
4AD albums
Dot Dash Recordings albums